Charlotte Oelschlägel, aka Charlotte Hayward (August 14, 1898 – November 14, 1984) was a German professional skater. For most of her life, she used only her first name as her stage name. She invented and first performed the figure skating elements death spiral and Charlotte spiral, which is named after her.

Personal life
Charlotte Oelschlägel was born in Berlin. As well as being a figure skater, she was also a musician. At age seven, she was on stage with the Berlin Philharmonic. She played the mandolin, lute, harp and piano. When she was 10 years old, she suffered from nervous and growing problems. Medications did not help. She was advised to do figure skating to treat her medical problems.

She was married to Curt Neumann, also a figure skater. She died in a retirement home in Berlin on November 14, 1984.

Career 
Oelschlägel initially skated with her brother Fritz. Later, she was coached by Paul Münder. She was known professionally by her first name.

In 1915, she became the first performer to star in a Broadway ice show, appearing in Hip-Hip-Hooray! at the New York Hippodrome. She was also the first skater to star in a motion picture, the American drama film The Frozen Warning (1917). According to figure skater writer and historian Ellyn Kestnbaum, "Charlotte bought skating into the conventions of specularized femininity that characterized early-twentieth-century popular entertainment".

In the 1920s, Oelschlägel and Neumann developed the death spiral and the move named for her, the Charlotte spiral (also called the "fadeout"), "a back spiral with the upper body leaning toward the skating foot and the free leg lifted to almost 180 degrees". These moves advanced the development of the use of flexibility in figure skating which, as Kestnbaum states, "generally favor a female rather than a male physique". 

In 1929, she appeared for the last time in a United States show in Cincinnati, Ohio. In 1939, her professional figure skating career ended due to the beginning of World War II. Her passport was confiscated by the Nazis. After the war, she worked as a coach at the club Grunewalder TC. She retired in 1976. She was inducted into the World Figure Skating Hall of Fame in 1985.

References

 Pirouette, 1995, numbers 5 and 6

External links

 
 

German figure skaters
Figure skaters from Berlin
1898 births
1984 deaths
19th-century German women
20th-century German women